The zebra-tailed lizard (Callisaurus draconoides) is a species of lizard in the family Phrynosomatidae. The species is native to the Southwestern United States and adjacent northwestern Mexico. There are nine recognized subspecies.

Habitat
Zebra-tailed lizards live in open desert with hard-packed soil, scattered vegetation, and scattered rocks, typically  flats, washes, and plains.

Description
These lizards are grey to sandy brown, usually with a series of paired dark gray spots down the back, becoming black crossbands on the tail. The underside of the tail is white with black crossbars. Males have a pair of black blotches on their sides, extending to blue patches on their bellies. Females have no blue patches, and the black bars are either faint or completely absent.

Behavior
Zebra-tailed lizards are diurnal and alert. They rise early and are active in all but the hottest weather. During the hottest times of day, lizards may stand alternately on two legs, switching to the opposite two as needed in a kind of dance. When threatened, they run swiftly with their toes curled up and tails raised over their backs, exposing the stripes. When stopped, they wag their curled tails side-to-side to distract predators. They can even run on their hind legs for short distances. In areas of creosote scrub, this lizard  reaches its highest population densities, around 4.8 to 6.0 individuals per acre (600 to 800 m² per lizard). This lizard burrows into fine sandy soil for retreat at night and usually seeks day shelter in the shade of bushes. It is also known to burrow under sand for safety when being chased by predators.

Reproduction
In summer, zebra-tailed lizards typically lay two to eight eggs, which hatch from July to November, but more than one clutch can be laid during a season. Eggs are laid, presumably, in friable, sandy soil. Being a prey species for many animals, including birds, other lizards, and mammals, they have a fairly high reproductive rate.

Diet
Lizards of the genus Callisaurus feed on a variety of prey, from insects, such as moths, ants and bees, to spiders and other smaller lizards. The diet occasionally includes vegetation, such as spring buds and flowers.

Geographic range
Zebra-tailed lizards are common and widely distributed throughout the Southwestern United States, ranging from the Mojave and Colorado deserts north into the southern Great Basin.

Taxonomy
The genus Callisaurus is monotypic, containing only one species, C. draconoides. Nine subspecies are recognized, including the nominotypical subspecies.

C. d. bogerti  – Bogert's zebra-tailed lizard
C. d. brevipes  – short-footed zebra-tailed lizard
C. d. carmenensis  – Carmen Island zebra-tailed lizard
C. d. crinitus  – Viscaino zebra-tailed lizard
C. d. draconoides  – common zebra-tailed lizard
C. d. inusitanus  – Sonoran zebra-tailed lizard
C. d. myurus  – Nevada zebra-tailed lizard
C. d. rhodostictus  – Mojave zebra-tailed lizard
C. d. ventralis  – eastern zebra-tailed lizard

Nota bene: A trinomial authority in parentheses indicates that the subspecies was originally described in a genus other than Callisaurus.

Etymology
The subspecific name, bogerti, is in honor of American herpetologist Charles Mitchill Bogert.

References

External links

Further reading
Behler, John L.; King, F. Wayne (1979). National Audubon Society Field Guide to North American Reptiles and Amphibians. New York: Alfred A. Knopf. (Chanticleer Press Edition). 743 pp. . (Callisaurus draconoides, p. 502 + Plate 362).
Blainville HD (1835). "Description de quelques espèces de reptiles de la Californie, précedée de l'analyse d'un système générale d'herpétologie et d'amphibiologie ". Nouvelles Annales du Muséum d'Histoire Naturelle 4: 233-296. (Callisaurus draconoides, new species, pp. 286–287 + Plate 24, figures 2, 2a). (in French).
Boulenger, George Albert (1885). Catalogue of the Lizards in the British Museum (Natural History). Second Edition. Volume II., Iguanidæ ... London: Trustees of the British Museum (Natural History). (Taylor and Francis, printers). xiii + 497 pp. + Plates I-XXIV. (Callisaurus draconoides, p. 206).
O'Shea, Mark; Halliday, Tim (2002). Reptiles and Amphibians: Smithsonian Handbooks. New York: Dorling Kindersley Publishing. 256 pp. .
Smith, Hobart M.; Brodie, Edmund D., Jr. (1982). Reptiles of North America: A Guide to Field Identification. New York: Golden Press. 240 pp.  (paperback);  (hardcover). (Callisaurus draconoides, pp. 130–131).
Stebbins, Robert C. (2003). A Field Guide to Western Reptiles and Amphibians, Third Edition. The Peterson Field Guide Series ®. Boston and New York: Houghton Mifflin Company. xiii + 533 pp. . (Callisaurus draconoides, pp. 279–280 + Plate 28 + Map 82).
Zim, Herbert S.; Smith, Hobart M. (1956). Reptiles and Amphibians: A Guide to Familiar Species: A Golden Nature Guide. New York: Simon and Schuster. 160 pp. (Callisaurus draconoides, pp. 55, 155).

Phrynosomatidae
Reptiles of the United States
Fauna of the Western United States
Fauna of the Mojave Desert
Fauna of the Colorado Desert
Fauna of the Great Basin
Fauna of the Sonoran Desert
Reptiles described in 1835
Taxa named by Henri Marie Ducrotay de Blainville